The Morning Star flag was a flag used in a supplemental fashion on Netherlands New Guinea to the flag of the Netherlands. It was first raised on 1 December 1961 prior to the territory coming under administration of the United Nations Temporary Executive Authority (UNTEA) on 1 October 1962.

The flag is used by the Free Papua Organization and other independence supporters. Under Papua's Special Autonomy Law, ratified in 2002, the flag may be raised in Western New Guinea (West Papua) region so long as the flag of Indonesia is also raised, and it is higher than the Morning Star flag.

The flag consists of a red vertical band along the hoist side, with a white five-pointed star in the center, and thirteen horizontal stripes, alternating blue and white, with seven blue stripes and six white ones. The seven blue stripes represent the seven customary territories of the region.

History
After territorial elections in February 1961, members of the New Guinea Council, a representative body consisting of 28 members, were sworn into office by Governor Dr. P.J. Platteel on 1 April 1961. The council's inauguration on 5 April 1961 was attended by representatives from Australia, France, the Netherlands, New Zealand, the United Kingdom and other Pacific Forum nations except the United States. The council appointed a National Committee to draft a manifesto expressing the desire for independence, and to design a flag and anthem commensurate with this desire. The design of the flag is credited to Nicolaas Jouwe. The full New Guinea Council endorsed these actions on 30 October 1961, and the first Morning Star flag was presented to Governor Platteel on 31 October 1961.
The Dutch authorities did not accept the denomination of the flag, recognising it as a territorial flag (landsvlag) not a national flag.

The flag was officially adopted by decree of the governor of Netherlands New Guinea of 18 November 1961 No. 362, published in the Gouvernementsblad van Nederlands-Nieuw-Guinea 1961 No. 68.

An inauguration ceremony was held on 1 December 1961 with the flag officially raised for the first time outside the council's building in the presence of the governor together with the Dutch flag.

Modern use 
On 1 July 1971 at Markas Victoria (Victoria Headquarters) in West Papua, Brigadier General Seth Jafeth Rumkorem, leader of the militant independence movement Free Papua Movement (OPM), proclaimed unilaterally Papua Barat or West Papua as an independent democratic republic. The Morning Star flag was declared as a national flag.

The Morning Star is flown by Papua independence movements and supporters across the world. Special ceremonies take place on 1 December of each year to commemorate the first flag raising in 1961. The flying of the Morning Star is seen by Indonesian authorities as advocating independence, challenging Indonesian sovereignty.

Two Papuan men, Filep Karma and Yusak Pakage, were sentenced to 15- and 10-year sentences for raising the flag in Jayapura in 2004. Pakage was released in 2010, having served five years of his term. Karma was released in November 2015 and allegedly suffered abuse at the hands of prison authorities during his incarceration. Amnesty International considered both men prisoners of conscience and designated Karma's case a 2011 "priority case". During celebrations of Papuan Flag Day in 2019, an unknown number of people were arrested for planning or carrying out celebrations of Papuan Flag Day, with sources reporting numbers from 34 to over 100 arrested. Many local governments in Papua have banned any form of activity commemorating the anniversary.

See also

Free Papua Movement
Coat of arms of Netherlands New Guinea
Hai Tanahku Papua
Coat of arms of the proposed Republic of West Papua

References

Further reading
Peter D. King, West Papua & Indonesia Since Suharto: Independence, Autonomy, or Chaos, p. 31–32
Richard Chauvel, ''Centre of Southeast Asian Studies Working Papers – Working Paper 121: Essays on West Papua, Vol. 2

External links

West Papua Information Kit – repository of reports and historical records

West Papua
Western New Guinea
Flags introduced in 1961
Netherlands New Guinea
Flags of indigenous peoples